WDKE (96.1 FM; "Duke FM") is a radio station broadcasting a classic country format. Licensed to Coleraine, Minnesota, United States, the station serves the Iron Range area. Established in 1995 as KGPZ, the station is owned by Midwest Communications.

In April 2012, KGPZ changed to "Z96 North Country", adding more New Country hits and no longer broadcasting Citadel Media's "Real Country" network. The station now directly competed with WUSZ (99.9 FM).

On January 1, 2017, as a result of a sale between Red Rock Radio and Midwest Communications (Midwest acquired KGPZ in the sale), 96.1 adjusted their format to classic country, as "96.1 Duke FM"; the sale essentially turned KGPZ from a rival to WUSZ into a flanker for it. On January 30, 2017, KGPZ changed their call letters to WDKE, to go with the "Duke FM" branding.

Former logo

References

External links

Country radio stations in the United States
Radio stations in Minnesota
Midwest Communications radio stations
Radio stations established in 1995
1995 establishments in Minnesota